Wintergirls (2009) is a realistic fiction novel by the American author Laurie Halse Anderson. The novel was published in 2009 by Viking. The story focuses on a girl, Lia Overbrook, who suffers from anorexia and self harm. Lia struggles to cope with her mental illness while balancing everything else going on in her life. Some months after a fall out with her best friend Cassie, Lia receives the news that she has died from bulimia. This complicates Lia's life even more and forces her to confront her own illness.

Plot 
Lia Overbrook, an 18-year-old girl, just found out that her ex-best friend Cassie has died. Cassie had called Lia 33 times the night of her death. However, Lia never answered the phone. Cassie was found in a hotel room, killed by her illness, bulimia. Lia, who has a history of anorexia, falls into a downward spiral of self-harm and calorie counting. To hide her illness from her family, Lia's obsessive and destructive behavior worsens and recovery seems impossible.

Lia's relationship with her step-mother, Jennifer, is also complicated. But Jennifer's nine-year-old daughter and Lia's step-sister, Emma, is one of the only things that keep her feeling happy. Lia has been struggling with eating disorders for quite some time and none of the help she received has made much of a difference. Lia finds it difficult to get close to her father and step-mother because they previously brought her to a hospital to recover.

Soon, Cassie's ghost starts haunting Lia. This makes Lia feel guilty for not picking up the phone that night and not being there for Cassie when she needed it most. Lia believes that if she had picked up the telephone, Cassie would still be alive. As Lia's self-harm becomes increasingly worse, Cassie's haunting becomes more aggressive.

In an act of desperation, Lia goes to the motel room where Cassie died and swallows a handful of sleeping pills in an attempt to block out her voice and get some rest. Because Lia's weight is so low, she ends up waking up in the hospital, finally realizing that she actually wants to live.

Awards and nominations 
Wintergirls was a New York Times bestseller and ALA best book for young adults. In 2009, the novel received the Kirkus Reviews best YA book. While in 2010 Wintergirls made the YALSA list, as well as received recognition from the Chicago Tribune as one of the top ten influential books of the decade. Wintergirls also won the 2010 Milwaukee County Teen Book Award.

Reception 
Wintergirls received mostly positive reviews from critics. Writing for The Guardian, Melvin Burgess notes that the novel is "an exhausting novel to read: brilliant, intoxication, full of drama, love, and like all the best books of this kind, hope." Burgess further notes, "It would be rare to find a novel in mainstream adult fiction prepared to pull out the dramatic stops this far, and difficult to imagine one in recent years that was prepared to be so bold stylistically." The Washington Post described the book as "both painful to read and riveting". The New York Times said that "We recognize Lia, but it's sometimes hard to relate to her." Common Sense Media rated the novel five stars, noting that the novel's writing style is innovative and that Lia's references to fairy tale imagery makes it appealing to young adult female readers. However, some critics have expressed concerned that Wintergirls could serve as a "trigger" novel, encouraging eating disorders in young girls rather than dissuading them. Jezebel observes that "read without supervision or discussion [for vulnerable teens] Wintergirls could indeed be triggering. But if read as part of a conversation...perhaps it could make a teen's world a little less dark."

References

2009 American novels
American young adult novels
Anorexia nervosa
Novels about eating disorders
Novels set in New Hampshire
Novels by Laurie Halse Anderson